The Kopa Trophy is an association football award presented to the best performing player under the age of 21. It is organised by France Football. 

The award is named after former French footballer Raymond Kopa and the winner is selected by former Ballon d'Or winners. Unlike the Golden Boy award, the Kopa Trophy, even if less prestigious, is also open to those who play outside of Europe.

Winners

Wins by player

Wins by country

Wins by club

Notes

References

European football trophies and awards
Awards established in 2018
Under-21 association football
Ballon d'Or
France Football awards